Cyperus maculatus is a species of sedge that occurs throughout much of Africa.

The species was first formally described by the botanist Johann Otto Boeckeler in 1864.

See also 
 List of Cyperus species

References 

maculatus
Taxa named by Johann Otto Boeckeler
Plants described in 1864
Flora of Zimbabwe
Flora of the Democratic Republic of the Congo
Flora of Zambia
Flora of Uganda
Flora of Tanzania
Flora of Sudan
Flora of Somalia
Flora of Sierra Leone
Flora of Seychelles
Flora of Senegal
Flora of Rwanda
Flora of Nigeria
Flora of Niger
Flora of Namibia
Flora of Mauritius
Flora of Mauritania
Flora of Mali
Flora of Malawi
Flora of Madagascar
Flora of Kenya
Flora of Ivory Coast
Flora of Guinea
Flora of Ghana
Flora of Gabon
Flora of Ethiopia
Flora of Egypt
Flora of Chad
Flora of the Republic of the Congo
Flora of the Central African Republic
Flora of Cameroon
Flora of Burundi
Flora of Burkina Faso
Flora of Botswana
Flora of Benin